The 2012 Mexican League season was the 88th season in the history of the Mexican League. It was contested by 16 teams, evenly divided in North and South zones. The season started on 16 March with the match between 2011 season champions Tigres de Quintana Roo and Diablos Rojos del México and ended on 29 August with the last game of the Serie del Rey, where Rojos del Águila de Veracruz defeated Rieleros de Aguascalientes to win the championship.

Two new teams joined the league. Dorados de Chihuahua and Tecolotes de Nuevo Laredo, that did not participate in the 2011 season due to financial problems, moved to Aguascalientes and Ciudad del Carmen respectively. This resulted in the return of Rieleros de Aguascalientes, that last played in the Mexican League in 2007, and the establishment of Delfines de Ciudad del Carmen.

Standings

Postseason

League leaders

Awards

References

Mexican League season
Mexican League season
Mexican League seasons